David Colin Wansbrough, OAM (born 29 April 1965) is a former field hockey player from Australia. He competed at both the 1988 Summer Olympics and the 1992 Summer Olympics, winning the silver medal with the Australian team in 1992.  He is currently a director of the Victorian Olympic Council, Kindilan Society and a partner at Evans and Partners stockbrokers in Melbourne.

References

External links
 

1965 births
Australian male field hockey players
Olympic field hockey players of Australia
Olympic silver medalists for Australia
Field hockey players at the 1988 Summer Olympics
Field hockey players at the 1992 Summer Olympics
1998 Men's Hockey World Cup players
Living people
Olympic medalists in field hockey
Medalists at the 1992 Summer Olympics
20th-century Australian people